Dasychira tephra, the tephra tussock moth, is a tussock moth in the family Erebidae. The species was first described by Jacob Hübner in 1809. It is found in North America.

The MONA or Hodges number for Dasychira tephra is 8292.

References

Further reading

External links

 

Lymantriinae
Articles created by Qbugbot
Moths described in 1809